Leopoldo Girelli (born 13 March 1953) is an Italian prelate of the Catholic Church who serves as the apostolic nuncio to India and to Nepal. He was nuncio to Israel and to Cyprus as well as apostolic delegate to Jerusalem and Palestine from 2017 to 2021. He has worked in the diplomatic service of the Holy See since 1987 and previously served as nuncio to Indonesia, East Timor and Singapore.

Biography 
Girelli was born in Predore, Province of Bergamo, Italy, on 13 March 1953.

He was ordained a priest on 17 June 1978 and incardinated in the diocese of Bergamo. He graduated in theology. To prepare for the diplomatic service, he completed the course of study at the Pontifical Ecclesiastical Academy in 1984.

He entered the diplomatic service of the Holy See on 13 July 1987 and worked in the papal diplomatic missions in Cameroon and New Zealand and at the Section for General Affairs of the Secretariat of State, and finally in the Apostolic Nunciature to the United States where he held the rank of Counsellor.

On 13 April 2006 Pope Benedict XVI appointed him apostolic nuncio to Indonesia and titular Archbishop of Capreae. He was consecrated bishop on 17 June, with Cardinal Angelo Sodano as principal consecrator. On 10 October 2006 he was appointed apostolic nuncio to East Timor in addition to his duties as nuncio to Indonesia.

On 13 January 2011 he was appointed Apostolic Nuncio to Singapore, Apostolic Delegate to Malaysia and to Brunei Darussalam, and non-residential papal representative for Vietnam. He was the first papal representative appointed for Vietnam since the expulsion of the resident Apostolic Delegate in 1975. On 18 June 2011 Girelli was also appointed Apostolic Nuncio to the Association of Southeast Asian Nations (ASEAN); he was the first to hold that title. On 16 January 2013, he was replaced as representative to Malaysia, Brunei and East Timor, while continuing in his posts in Singapore, Vietnam, and the ASEAN.

On 13 September 2017, Pope Francis appointed Girelli Apostolic Nuncio to Israel and Apostolic Delegate to Jerusalem and Palestine. Two days later, Girelli was also appointed Apostolic Nuncio to Cyprus.

Pope Francis appointed him Apostolic Nuncio to India on 13 March 2021 and added the title of Apostolic Nuncio to Nepal on 13 September of that year.

Notes

See also
 List of heads of the diplomatic missions of the Holy See

References

External links

  

1953 births
21st-century Italian Roman Catholic titular archbishops
Apostolic Nuncios to Indonesia
Apostolic Nuncios to East Timor
Apostolic Nuncios to Malaysia
Apostolic Nuncios to Singapore
Apostolic Nuncios to Israel
Apostolic Nuncios to Cyprus
Apostolic Nuncios to India
Apostolic Nuncios to Nepal
Apostolic Nuncios to ASEAN
Pontifical Ecclesiastical Academy alumni
Living people
Diplomats of the Holy See